Bere Island GFC is a Gaelic Athletic Association club based on Bere Island in Cork, Ireland. Its Gaelic Football team participates in competitions organized by Cork GAA, and plays in the Beara division.

History
The club is known to have played its first game around the start of the 20th century. The population of the island was much stronger at this time and the facilities were as good as any club in the county at the time. Bere Island's home pitch the 'Rec' was a man made pitch constructed by the British Army. 
During the 1930s and 1940s, Bere Island had their most successful period. They reached a county final in 1944.
The team disbanded and started again a number of times in the following decades.  The current era the team reformed in 1995, winning the Beara Junior B title in 1996 and 2008. They have represented Beara a number of times in the Cork County Championship in recent years.

Achievements
 Cork Junior Football Championship Runners-Up 1941, 1946
 Beara Junior Football Championship Winners (7) 1930, 1936, 1939, 1941, 1942, 1981, 1985

Notable players
 Patrick "Weeshie" Murphy played with Cork Senior Football team and on Railway Cup teams from 1944-1952

References

Gaelic games clubs in County Cork
Gaelic football clubs in County Cork